The 2022 season is the 132nd competitive association football season in New Zealand.

National teams

New Zealand men's national football team

Results and fixtures

Friendlies

FIFA World Cup qualification

Group B

Final stage

2022 FIFA World Cup qualification (inter-confederation play-offs)

New Zealand women's national football team

Results and fixtures

Friendlies

2022 SheBelieves Cup

New Zealand national under-20 football team

Results and fixtures

2022 OFC U-19 Championship

Group A

Knockout stage

New Zealand women’s national under-20 football team

Results and fixtures

Friendlies

2022 FIFA U-20 Women's World Cup

Group B

New Zealand women’s national under-17 football team

Results and fixtures

2022 FIFA U-17 Women's World Cup

Group B

OFC Competitions

OFC Champions League

Group stage

Group B

Knockout stage

Final

Men's football

National League

Grand final

Northern League

Central League

Southern League

Cup Competitions

Chatham Cup

Final

Women's football

National Women's League

Grand final

NRFL Women’s Premier League

Cup Competitions

Kate Sheppard Cup

Final

References

2022 in association football
Association football in New Zealand